Mabu'im (lit. Springs) is a community settlement in southern Israel. Located to the north-east of Netivot, it falls under the jurisdiction of Merhavim Regional Council.

History
The village was established in 1958 as a village centre for the local moshavim. In the 1990s it grew rapidly as it absorbed new residents. Like several other moshavim in the area, its name is derived from the Book of Isaiah 35:7 - "And the parched land shall become a pool, and the thirsty ground springs of water; in the habitation of jackals herds shall lie down, it shall be an enclosure for reeds and rushes.

References

Community settlements
Populated places established in 1958
1958 establishments in Israel
Populated places in Southern District (Israel)